The list of supporters of the BDS movement include those who have either voiced support for the BDS movement or for comprehensive boycotts against Israel. The list does not include people who support boycotting products from Israeli settlements but not from Israel. The year column denotes the year they most recently professed support for such a boycott.

See also 
 Boycott, Divestment and Sanctions
 List of opponents of the BDS movement
 List of organizations that have endorsed the BDS movement

References

Boycott, Divestment and Sanctions
Lists of people by ideology